The 2021 Ostrava Challenger was a professional tennis tournament played on clay courts. It was the 18th edition of the tournament which was part of the 2021 ATP Challenger Tour. It took place in Ostrava, Czech Republic between 26 April and 2 May.

Singles main-draw entrants

Seeds

 1 Rankings are as of 19 April 2021.

Other entrants
The following players received wildcards into the singles main draw:
  Martin Krumich
  Jiří Lehečka
  Patrik Rikl

The following player received entry into the singles main draw as an alternate:
  Marcelo Tomás Barrios Vera

The following players received entry from the qualifying draw:
  Lukáš Klein
  Lucas Miedler
  Alex Molčan
  Oscar Otte

Champions

Singles
 
 Benjamin Bonzi def.  Renzo Olivo 6–4, 6–4.

Doubles

 Marc Polmans /  Sergiy Stakhovsky def.  Andrew Paulson /  Patrik Rikl 7–6(7–4), 3–6, [10–7].

References

2021 ATP Challenger Tour
2021
2021 in Czech tennis
April 2021 sports events in the Czech Republic
May 2021 sports events in the Czech Republic